FTP bounce attack is an exploit of the FTP protocol whereby an attacker is able to use the  command to request access to ports indirectly through the use of the victim machine, which serves as a proxy for the request, similar to an Open mail relay using SMTP.

This technique can be used to port scan hosts discreetly, and to potentially bypass a network Access-control list to access specific ports that the attacker cannot access through a direct connection, for example with the nmap port scanner. 

Nearly all modern FTP server programs are configured by default to refuse  commands that would connect to any host but the originating host, thwarting FTP bounce attacks.

See also
 Confused deputy problem

References

External links
CERT Advisory on FTP Bounce Attack
CERT Article on FTP Bounce Attack
Original posting describing the attack

File Transfer Protocol
Computer network security